Almscliffe Crag, or Almscliff Crag, also known as Great Almscliff Crag to distinguish from Little Almscliff,  north west, is a Millstone Grit outcrop at the top of a small hill near the village of North Rigton, between Leeds and Harrogate in North Yorkshire, England. The crag lies on the boundary of the civil parishes of North Rigton and Stainburn.  The crag was formed due to the softer adjacent strata of shale and mudstone eroding at a faster rate than the hard wearing millstone.

The crag is a Site of Special Scientific Interest.

Rock climbing 
The crag is one of the best climbing locations in the area. The crag was featured in the first rock climbing guide to the Peak District, 'Some Gritstone Climbs', published in 1913 and written by John Laycock. Some classic climbs include Parsons' Chimney (HS 4b), Black Wall Eliminate (E2 5c), and Wall of Horrors (E3 5c). It is also a popular destination for walkers.

As a film location 
Almscliffe Crag has proved popular as a filming location for Yorkshire Television. From 1998 to 2005 it appeared in the opening titles of the ITV soap Emmerdale.  Each series of The Beiderbecke Trilogy ends at Almscliffe Crag. An earlier TV appearance was as the planet Obsidian in 'Volcano' in Episode 3 of Series 3 of the BBC Sci fi series Blake's 7 which aired in 1980.

Name 
The name was first recorded in the early 13th century in the form Almusclyve.  According to one source the name appears to come from a female personal name Almus:  although that name is not recorded, it is similar to Middle English female names ending in -us recorded from Yorkshire.  Another theory links the name to the Celtic al "fire" and mias "altar".

References

External links
Blake's 7 "Volcano" (1980). Episode featuring Almscliffe Crag as a location. YouTube.com. Retrieved 30 March 2018

Landforms of North Yorkshire
Tourist attractions in North Yorkshire
Climbing areas of England
Rock formations of England
Mountains and hills of North Yorkshire
Sites of Special Scientific Interest in North Yorkshire